The 2023 Veikkausliiga is the 93rd season of top-tier football in Finland. HJK are the defending champions.

Teams

HIFK were relegated to Ykkönen after finishing at the bottom of the 2022 season. Their place was taken by 2022 Ykkönen champions KTP.

Stadia and locations

Personnel and kits
Note: Flags indicate national team as has been defined under FIFA eligibility rules. Players and Managers may hold more than one non-FIFA nationality.

Regular season

League table

Results

References

External links
 Official website
 Soccerway

Veikkausliiga seasons
Vei
Fin
Fin